Hypena abyssinialis, the streaked snout, is a moth of the family Erebidae. The species was first described by Achille Guenée in 1854. It is found in many African and South Asian countries.

Larval host plants are Lantana camara and Lantana indica.

References

Moths of Asia
Moths of Africa
Moths described in 1854
abyssinialis